Coming Through Slaughter: The Bolden Legend is the first large ensemble jazz album by composer Dave Lisik. It features trumpeter Tim Hagans, saxophonist Donny McCaslin, trombonist Luis Bonilla, and drummer Matt Wilson. The title and inspiration of the music (multi-movement jazz suite) and recording comes from the novel Coming Through Slaughter from the author Michael Ondaatje.

Background 
The recording features experimental music/jazz inspired by the book Coming Through Slaughter. This is performed in a large ensemble format and features a wide range of artists from the United States.

Track listing

Recording Sessions 
 Spring 2009
 recorded in Memphis TN, Bloomington, IN and Staten Island, N.Y.

Personnel

Musicians 
Conductor/composer: Dave Lisik
Trumpet (solo): Tim Hagans
Trombone (solo): Luis Bonilla
Soprano and tenor saxes (solo): Donny McCaslin
Drums (featured): Matt Wilson
Soprano sax, alto sax, flute, clarinet (lead): Jack Cooper 
Alto sax, flute, clarinet: Gary Topper
Tenor sax, clarinet: Art Edmaiston
Tenor sax, clarinet: Dustin Laurenzi
Tenor sax, clarinet: Mike Krepper
Bari sax, bass clarinet, tenor sax: Tom Link
Trumpet, flugelhorn (lead): Joey Tartell
Trumpet, flugelhorn: Marlin McKay
Trumpet, flugelhorn: Ryan Imboden
Trumpet, flugelhorn: Dave Lisik
Horn: Jeff Nelsen
Horn: Dan Phillips
Trombone (lead): Anthony Williams
Trombone: Tony Garcia
Trombone: John Grodrian
Bass trombone: David Dick
Guitar: Corey Christiansen
Piano: Amy Rempel
Bass: Jeremy Allen 
Percussion: Joe Galvin

Production 
Recording: Robert Yugleur and Dave Lisik
Mixing: Robert Yugleur, Dave Lisik, and Trevor Jorgensen
Additional recording and mastering: Ed Reed    
Liner notes: Tom Graves

Reception 

"...Although one can't know how someone else would have handled the task, Lisik has completed it with flying colors—thanks in part to splendid support from Hagans, McCaslin, Bonilla, Wilson and the ensemble. It must be noted that the album won't suit everyone's taste; it is more cerebral than candid, and its jagged edges can stun the senses and fray the nerves. But Lisik is telling a story, parts of which are ambivalent musically, as they were in life. Weighed on its own terms, Coming Through Slaughter is a well-drawn and admirable work of art."

Jack Bowers, AllAboutJazz.com

"...Evocative orchestral settings like "The Drawings of Audubon" and "Cricket Noises and Cricket Music" inspire Hagans, McCaslin and pianist Amy Rempel ― a CD standout ― to speak more with expressiveness than technical ability, always a good thing when musicians with their virtuosity are involved. Trombonist Luis Bonilla and percussionist Joe Galvin make strong statements on "Auditorium of Enemies," another intriguing composition by Lisik. On Coming Through Slaughter, flawless musicianship finds itself fully engaged with challenging material."

Glen Hall, exclaim.ca

"...Ondaatje's 1976 book draws on what historical record there is, but Lisik, a jazz trumpeter and professor, had no such resource...That turned out to be a good thing, however..." 
Chris Smith, Winnipeg Free Press

References

External links 
 Coming Through Slaughter: The Bolden Legend Web Page
 

2010 albums
Jazz albums by American artists